Connor Clifton (born April 28, 1995) is an American professional ice hockey defenseman for the  Boston Bruins of the National Hockey League (NHL). He played collegiate hockey with Quinnipiac University.

Playing career
Born in Long Branch, New Jersey and raised in Matawan, New Jersey, Clifton played prep hockey at Christian Brothers Academy together with his brother, Tim. Having played in his draft eligible year within the U.S. National Development Team Program where the team won silver in the 2013 IIHF World Under-18 Championship, Clifton was originally drafted by the Phoenix Coyotes in the fifth-round, 133rd overall, of the 2013 NHL Entry Draft.

Clifton began his freshman season at Quinnipiac University during the 2013–14 season. He was named to the ECAC Hockey All-Academic Team during all four seasons with the Quinnipiac Bobcats. In his junior season, Clifton was named captain of the Bobcats and at the conclusion of the season was named to the ECAC Hockey All-Tournament, NCAA East All-Frozen Four Team, and honored as Team ECAC Hockey Tournament Most Outstanding Player. Following his senior season and un-signed from the Coyotes, Clifton signed with the Boston Bruins American Hockey League affiliate, the Providence Bruins.

Professional
In 2017 after failing to reach an agreement with the Arizona Coyotes, Clifton signed with the Providence Bruins where he played 54 games.

He was signed to a two year NHL contract by the Boston Bruins on May 3, 2018. Clifton began the 2018-2019 season in Providence but made his NHL debut on November 16, 2018, against the Dallas Stars after being recalled on an emergency basis.

On March 23, 2019, Clifton registered his first NHL point with an assist on a Noel Acciari's goal, in a 7–3 win over the Florida Panthers. He scored his first NHL goal in Game 2 of the Eastern Conference Final against the Carolina Hurricanes, as part of a 6–2 rout. The Bruins would later advance to the Stanley Cup Final, but would lose to the St. Louis Blues in seven games.

On July 1, 2019, Clifton signed a 3-year, $3 million contract extension with the Bruins.

Career statistics

Regular season and playoffs

International

Awards and honors

References

External links

1995 births
Living people
American men's ice hockey defensemen
Arizona Coyotes draft picks
Boston Bruins players
Christian Brothers Academy (New Jersey) alumni
Ice hockey players from New Jersey
Sportspeople from Long Branch, New Jersey
People from Matawan, New Jersey
Quinnipiac Bobcats men's ice hockey players
Sportspeople from Monmouth County, New Jersey
Providence Bruins players
USA Hockey National Team Development Program players